This is a list of equestrian statues in Hungary.

Budapest 
Millenniumi emlékmű (Millennium Monument) by Zala György at the Hősök tere (Heroes' Square) with seven equestrians of the seven Magyar tribes leaders: Árpád, Előd, Ond, Kond, Tas, Huba, and Töhötöm (Tétény), 1894-1929.
Equestrian of King Stephen I by Alajos Stróbl in the Fischer Bastion, 1906.
Equestrian of Prince Rákóczi Ferenc II.
Equestrian of Artúr Görgey.
Equestrian of Prince Savoyai Jenő by József Róna in the Buda Castle, 1900.

Dombóvár 
Monument to Sebestyén Tinódi Lantos by Dávid Raffay, 2000.

Makó 
Equestrian of King Stephen I by Lajos Győrfi and Jenő Ferenc Kiss.

Pécs 
Equestrian of Hunyadi János by Pál Pátzay the Széchenyi square, 1956.

Szeged 
Equestrian of Prince Rákóczi Ferenc II.
Equestrian of King Hunyadi Mátyás.
Memorial of the World War I heroes in front of the  Reök-palota (Reok Palace).

Székesfehérvár 
Equestrian of King Stephen I by Ferenc Sidló, 1938.
Memorial of 10th Hussar Regiment by Pál Pátzay, 1939.

Gyula 
Equestrian named Végvári vitéz szobra by Béla Tóth close to the castle of Gyula, 1974.

Szekszárd 
Equestrian of Háry János by Farkas Pál, 1992.

Szigetvár 
Equestrian of Miklós Zrínyi by József Somogyi.

Tata 
Equestrian named Tatai Diana by Béla Tóth close to the Esterházy palace, 1988.

Tatabánya 
Equestrian of Prince József.

Zalaegerszeg 
Equestrian of Miklós Zrínyi by Tóth Béla, 1989.

References

Lists of buildings and structures in Hungary
Hungary